Aaron Thomas may also refer to:
 Aaron Thomas (American football), American football player
 Aaron H. Thomas, alleged East Coast rapist
 Aaron Thomas (cricketer) (born 1985), English cricketer
 Aaron Rahsaan Thomas, American television and film screenwriter and producer

See also